Pokrov is a town in Petushinsky District of Vladimir Oblast, Russia, located  to the north of the left bank of the Klyazma River (Oka's tributary),  west of Vladimir, the administrative center of the oblast, and  east of Moscow. Population:     2,925 (1897).

History
It was established in the 17th century as a monastery village and was granted town status in 1778.

Administrative and municipal status
Within the framework of administrative divisions, Pokrov is directly subordinated to Petushinsky District. As a municipal division, the town of Pokrov is incorporated within Petushinsky Municipal District as Pokrov Urban Settlement.

Economy
Pokrov has favorable economic and geographical position between the major regional centers of the European part of Russia. The town is home to a Mondelez International chocolate factory, and in 2009 the company commissioned what is believed to be the world's first Monument to Chocolate here.

References

Notes

Sources

Cities and towns in Vladimir Oblast
Pokrovsky Uyezd
Populated places established in the 17th century